Is the Man Who Is Tall Happy? is a 2013 French animated documentary film by Michel Gondry about the linguist, philosopher, and political activist Noam Chomsky.

Cast
 Noam Chomsky as himself
 Michel Gondry as himself

Release
Originally titled Is the Man Who Is Tall Happy?: An Animated Conversation with Noam Chomsky, it was first screened on 12 February 2013 at the Massachusetts Institute of Technology. The film had its European premiere in the Panorama section of the 64th Berlin International Film Festival.

Reception

Reviews
Rotten Tomatoes reports that 92% of critics gave the film a positive review, based upon a sample of 36, with an average score of 7.2 out of 10. Metacritic, which assigns a rating out of 100 to reviews from mainstream critics, gave the film an average score of 76 based on 16 reviews.

References

External links
 
 
 
 
 
 

2013 films
2013 animated films
2013 documentary films
2010s French animated films
Animated documentary films
English-language French films
Films directed by Michel Gondry
French animated speculative fiction films
French documentary films
Works about Noam Chomsky
2010s English-language films